Annamarie Saarinen  is an American health advocate, economist and co-founder of the Newborn Foundation,  a 501(c)(3) organization that aims to accelerate the pace of early detection and intervention for treatable newborn health conditions. Saarinen also co-founded Bloom Standard, a social impact innovation lab developing early diagnostic technologies for children in remote and resource poor settings.

Life
Saarinen is an adoptee, and she grew up in a small town in southwestern Minnesota.

In 2008, Saarinen's daughter Eve was born with a critical congenital heart defect (CCHD) and survived two heart surgeries in the first months of her life. This experience inspired Saarinen to create the Newborn Foundation | Coalition and launched the country’s first multi-hospital newborn heart screening pilot in collaboration with a state department of health, with the purpose of making CCHD screening a standard of care in the United States.

In 2011, the Newborn Foundation | Coalition successfully lobbied the U.S. Department of Health and Human Services to include pulse-oximetry testing for CCHDs in their universal screening recommendations. The screening was endorsed by the American Academy of Pediatrics, the American College of Cardiology, the American Heart Association and the March of Dimes.  As a result, all 50 states including the District of Columbia adopted the Routine Uniform Screening Panel (RUSP). 

The BORN project has provided neonatal pulse oximetry screening training and implementation, and a data collection framework for more than 1,200 health workers, expanding its screening cohort to nearly 300,000 newborns across 200 delivery sites in 10 low and middle-income countries. It was also among the first formal public/private sector commitments to reduce preventable newborn mortality as part of the UN Secretary General's Every Woman, Every Child initiative. Approximately 4 million U.S. newborns each year are now being screened for heart defects using pulse oximetry. The BORN Project was selected to address the UN Sustainable Development Goals addressing human rights, health equity and innovation. 

In 2016, Saarinen was appointed by the U.S. Secretary of Health and Human Services under the Obama administration to the federal Advisory Committee on Heritable Disorders in Newborns and Children (ACHDNC).

References 

1960 births
Living people
Activists from Minnesota
American adoptees